New Haven may refer to:

 New Haven, Hamilton County, Ohio, a census-designated place
 New Haven, Huron County, Ohio, a census-designated place
 New Haven Township, Huron County, Ohio

See also
New Haven (disambiguation)